The Division of Burt is an Australian electoral division in Perth in the state of Western Australia.

Burt contains Perth's growing southeastern suburban corridor and covers 190 square kilometers. Major suburbs include Armadale, Gosnells, Thornlie, Kenwick, Huntingdale, Harrisdale, Piara Waters and Southern River. Burt is a middle- and working-class electorate with a high rate of Trade Union membership.

The current and inaugural MP is Matt Keogh, a member of the Australian Labor Party. He has held the seat since its inception in 2016.

History

The division was created in 2015 and was named after the Burt family, specifically Sir Archibald Burt, Septimus Burt and Sir Francis Burt. The division is located in the south-eastern suburbs of Perth and covers areas that had previously been represented by the divisions of Canning, Hasluck and Tangney.

The seat was first contested at the 2016 federal election.  Based on the results from the 2013 federal election the division was created as a notionally fairly safe Liberal with a notional two-party preferred margin of 6.1 percent. However, based on  federal polling indicating a large nine percent two-party swing to Labor since the last election, Burt was tipped as one of several seats that could have potentially fallen to Labor at the 2016 federal election.  Additionally, much of the seat's territory is represented by Labor at state level.

The seat was won by Labor's Matt Keogh, who had been the Labor candidate in the 2015 Canning by-election, on a swing of over 13 percent, turning it from fairly safe Liberal to fairly safe Labor.

Geography
Since 1984, federal electoral division boundaries in Australia have been determined at redistributions by a redistribution committee appointed by the Australian Electoral Commission. Redistributions occur for the boundaries of divisions in a particular state, and they occur every seven years, or sooner if a state's representation entitlement changes or when divisions of a state are malapportioned.

In August 2021, the Australian Electoral Commission announced that the suburb of Canning Vale would be transferred from Burt to the seat of Tangney, while Burt would gain the suburbs of Kenwick, Maddington, Orange Grove and part of Martin from the seat of Canning. These boundary changes took place as of the 2022 election.

The seat presently comprises considerable portions of the City of Gosnells and the City of Armadale. Suburbs presently included are:

City of Armadale 

 Armadale
 Brookdale 
 Camillo 
 Champion Lakes 
 Forrestdale 
 Harrisdale 
 Haynes
 Hilbert (part)
 Kelmscott
 Mount Nasura
 Piara Waters 
 Seville Grove 
 Wungong (part)

City of Gosnells 

 Beckenham
 Gosnells
 Huntingdale
 Kenwick
 Langford
 Maddington
 Martin (part)
 Orange Grove
 Southern River

Members

Election results

Notes 

Electoral divisions of Australia
Constituencies established in 2015
2015 establishments in Australia